Washington is a city in and the county seat of Washington County, Iowa, United States. It is part of the Iowa City, Iowa Metropolitan Statistical Area. The population was 7,352 at the time of the 2020 census.

History

Washington was founded in 1839 as the county seat of the newly established Washington County. In 1854 it became the home of a United Presbyterian College, which was dissolved in 1864. As of 2014, the town has celebrated its 175th anniversary, only 5 years behind the oldest city in Iowa, Dubuque, Iowa.

In 2016, the Guinness World Book of Records certified the State Theatre in Washington, Iowa, as the "world's oldest continually operating cinema theatre".

Geography
Washington is located at  (41.299941, -91.689175).

Climate

Demographics

2010 census
As of the census of 2010, there were 7,266 people, 3,048 households, and 1,861 families living in the city. The racial makeup of the city was 92.5% White, 1.4% African American, 0.2% Native American, 0.5% Asian, 0.2% Pacific Islander, 2.7% from other races, and 2.6% from two or more races. Hispanic or Latino of any race were 10.7% of the population.

There were 3,048 households, of which 29.4% had children under the age of 18 living with them, 46.5% were married couples living together, 10.2% had a female householder with no husband present, 4.3% had a male householder with no wife present, and 38.9% were non-families. 33.8% of all households were made up of individuals, and 16.6% had someone living alone who was 65 years of age or older. The average household size was 2.31 and the average family size was 2.93.

The median age in the city was 42.4 years. 23.8% of residents were under the age of 18; 7.1% were between the ages of 18 and 24; 22.1% were from 25 to 44; 25.9% were from 45 to 64; and 21.1% were 65 years of age or older. The gender makeup of the city was 48.1% male and 51.9% female.

2000 census
As of the census of 2000, there were 7,047 people, 2,928 households, and 1,903 families living in the city. The racial makeup of the city was 95.20% White, 0.57% African American, 0.11% Native American, 0.35% Asian, 0.04% Pacific Islander, 2.72% from other races, and 0.99% from two or more races. Hispanic or Latino of any race were 4.71% of the population.

There were 2,928 households, out of which 27.7% had children under the age of 18 living with them, 53.8% were married couples living together, 8.6% had a female householder with no husband present, and 35.0% were non-families. 30.9% of all households were made up of individuals, and 16.7% had someone living alone who was 65 years of age or older. The average household size was 2.31 and the average family size was 2.88.

Age spread: 22.8% under the age of 18, 7.2% from 18 to 24, 24.9% from 25 to 44, 21.6% from 45 to 64, and 23.5% who were 65 years of age or older. The median age was 42 years. For every 100 females, there were 85.1 males. For every 100 females age 18 and over, there were 82.8 males.

The median income for a household in the city was $36,067, and the median income for a family was $44,497. Males had a median income of $29,961 versus $20,706 for females. The per capita income for the city was $18,145. About 5.4% of families and 9.3% of the population were below the poverty line, including 16.3% of those under age 18 and 5.7% of those age 65 or over.

Government
Washington is governed by a six-member city council headed by a mayor. The mayor and council members are elected for four-year terms. The city council consists of four ward counselors and two At-Large members. The current mayor is Jaron Rosien and the council members are, Millie Youngquist (At-Large), Steve Gualt (2nd Ward), Brendan DeLong (3rd Ward), Elaine Moore (At-Large), Fran Stigers (4th Ward), and Danielle Pettit-Majewski (1st Ward).

Education
The Washington Community School District operates local schools, including Washington High School.

Notable people

 Charles Almon Dewey, United States federal judge
 Harry W. Bolens, Wisconsin State Senator
 Smith Wildman Brookhart, United States Senator
 Eva Carter Buckner, poet, suffragist, songwriter
 Matt Fish, basketball player
 Owen Gingerich, astronomer
 Mike Hennigan, NFL player and coach
 John F. McJunkin, Iowa state senator
 Pierce Knox, blind xylophonist
 Keith Molesworth, basketball player and coach
 Pam Roth, Illinois state representative
 John M. Work, Socialist and newspaper editor

See also

Saving Brinton

Footnotes

External links

Official City Website
Washington Chamber of Commerce
Official Facebook Page

 
Cities in Washington County, Iowa
Cities in Iowa
County seats in Iowa
Iowa City metropolitan area
1839 establishments in Iowa Territory